Long Duck Pond is a  pond in the West Wind Shores neighborhood of Plymouth, Massachusetts. The pond is located east of Big Rocky Pond and west of Little Herring Pond and Triangle Pond. The water quality is impaired due to non-native aquatic plants.

External links
Environmental Protection Agency

Ponds of Plymouth, Massachusetts
Ponds of Massachusetts